The Saxon Monk is a breed of fancy pigeon. Saxon Monks, along with other varieties of domesticated pigeons, are all descendants from the rock pigeon (Columba livia).

Appearance 
The Saxon Monk comes in five colors including blue, black, purple, red, yellow and silver with white bars or spangles with pink wings

Origin

See also 
List of pigeon breeds
Saxon Shield
Saxon Spot

References

External links 

 Saxon Monk Standard

Pigeon breeds
Pigeon breeds originating in Germany